ZCA or zca may refer to:

 Zero-phase component analysis - a variant of principal component analysis with rotation neutralized.

Zee Cine Awards, an awards ceremony for the Indian film industry
zca, the ISO 639-3 code for the Coatecas Altas Zapotec in Oaxaca, Mexico